Jawahar Navodaya Vidyalaya, Theog or JNV Theog, Shimla is a Jawahar Navodaya Vidyalaya school in district Shimla of Himachal Pradesh, India.

Like every other Navodaya in the country, it too follows the same aim and regulation of administration and extracurricular development of mainly rural children of the area of Shimla.

History 
The school was established in 1986, and is a part of Jawahar Navodaya Vidyalaya schools. The permanent campus of this school is located at village Deorighat, Theog. This school is administered and monitored by Chandigarh regional office of Navodaya Vidyalaya Smiti.

Admission 
Admission to JNV Theog at class VI level is made through selection test conducted by Navodaya Vidyalaya Smiti. The information about test is disseminated and advertised in the district by the office of Shimla district magistrate (Collector), who is also chairperson of Vidyalya Management Committee.

Affiliations 
JNV Shimla is affiliated to Central Board of Secondary Education with affiliation number 640002, following the curriculum prescribed by CBSE.

Streams offered  
Courses available at secondary level.
 Hospitality and tourism
 Commerce
 Science

See also 
 Jawahar Navodaya Vidyalaya for unified scheme of purpose and function of a Navodaya Vidyalaya
 Jawahar Navodaya Vidyalaya, Lahaul and Spiti
 Jawahar Navodaya Vidyalaya, Kullu

References

External links 

 Official Website of JNV Shimla

High schools and secondary schools in Himachal Pradesh
Schools in Shimla district
Jawahar Navodaya Vidyalayas in Himachal Pradesh
Educational institutions established in 1986
1986 establishments in Himachal Pradesh